The 1924 Kenosha Maroons season was their sole season in the National Football League. The team finished 0–4–1, and tied for sixteenth place in the league.

Schedule

Standings

References

Kenosha Maroons seasons
Kenosha Maroons
National Football League winless seasons